Resha Konkar is an Indian television actress. She is known for portraying the role of Rinki Bhalla on Yeh Hai Mohabbatein and Gauri Agarwal on Aap Ke Aa Jane Se that airs on Zee TV.

Career
Konkar rose to fame in 2010, when she appeared as herself in the third episode of Season 1 in the reality show Emotional Atyachar. In 2012, she started her acting career when she starred in the series Junoon – Aisi Nafrat Toh Kaisa Ishq as Sunheri Ramdhari Singh. In the same year, she joined Bade Acche Lagte Hain as Saumya. In 2015, she was cast in the series Yeh Hai Mohabbatein as Rinki Bhalla. In 2016, she was cast in the episodic roles in the horror serial Darr Sabko Lagta Hai, and a crime show Savdhaan India. In late 2017, she bagged the recurring role of Gauri Agarwal on Zee TV's Aap Ke Aa Jane Se.

Filmography

References

External links

Indian television actresses
Living people
People from Mumbai
1987 births
21st-century Indian actresses